Belovište, until 1945 Golemo Turčane is a village in the municipality of Gostivar, North Macedonia.

History
According to the 1467-68 Ottoman defter, Golemo Turčane appears as being largely inhabited by an Orthodox Christian Albanian population. Some families had a mixed Slav-Albanian anthroponomy - usually a Slavic first name and an Albanian last name or last names with Albanian patronyms and Slavic suffixes.

The names are:: Gjon Arbanas (t. Arnaut); Daba, son of Gjon; Nikolla, son of Mir-o; Jeni, son of Mir-o-; Mir-o, the son of Boja; Dimitri, son of Stala; Stepan, son of Gjon; Petko, son of Gjon; Simon, son of Nikolla; Gjon, son of Kalogjer; Bozha, son of Kalogjer; widow Kalina; and widow Mara.

Demographics
According to the 2002 census, the village had a total of 2267 inhabitants. Ethnic groups in the village include:

Albanians 1418
Macedonians 832
Romani 5
Bosniaks 1
Others 11

References

External links

Villages in Gostivar Municipality
Albanian communities in North Macedonia